Kees van Dijke (18 December 1902 – 3 May 1983) was a Dutch footballer. He played in three matches for the Netherlands national football team in 1925.

References

External links
 

1902 births
1983 deaths
Dutch footballers
Netherlands international footballers
Association football defenders
Footballers from Rotterdam
Feyenoord players
Dutch football managers
Feyenoord managers